Hemiculter varpachovskii is a species of ray-finned fish in the genus Hemiculter from the Khalkh River and Lake Buir in Mongolia and Lake Hulun in China. It may also occur in the upper drainage of the Argun River in Russia and China.

Footnotes 
 

Hemiculter
Fish described in 1903
Taxa named by Alexander Nikolsky